Onchidella maculata is a species of air-breathing sea slug, a shell-less marine pulmonate gastropod mollusk in the family Onchidiidae.

Description
A small (10mm) mottled brown hemispherical slug. Skin thick and warty, head with a pair of short brown tentacles.

Distribution
Orange River mouth to Cape Agulhas.

References

External links

Onchidiidae
Gastropods described in 1893